Aaron Galuten (March 2, 1917–September 23, 1994) was an American mathematician, known mainly as the founder and principal operator of the Chelsea Publishing Company.

References 

1917 births
1994 deaths
20th-century American mathematicians
Place of birth missing
Place of death missing
American book publishing company founders